The Calvert Social Index is a stock market index created by Calvert Investments as a benchmark of large companies that are considered socially responsible or ethical. It currently consists of 680 companies, weighted by market capitalization, selected from approximately 1,000 of the largest publicly traded companies in the United States using Calvert's social criteria. These criteria relate to the environment, workplace issues, product safety, community relations, weapons contracting, international operations, and human rights.

This index was created following the success of the Domini 400 Social Index by KLD Research & Analytics, Inc. The Calvert index is used by many so-called socially responsible mutual funds as a benchmark for their performance.

See also 
FTSE4Good Index
MSCI KLD 400 Social Index

References

External links 
 Calvert Investments: The Calvert Social Index
 GreenBiz: Calvert Social Index

American stock market indices
Ethical investment stock market indices
Economy and the environment